James Woodrow Lewis (1912-1999) was a chief justice on the South Carolina Supreme Court.

Lewis was born in the Swift Creek area of Darlington County, South Carolina on March 8, 1912. Although he began law school in 1931, economic conditions during the Depression forced him to return home to Swift Creek to run a country store owned by his father. He continued studying the law under the tutelage of a local lawyer, and he was admitted to practice on December 6, 1935. At the age of 22, he was elected to the Statehouse. Legislators were exempt from the draft during World War II, but he resigned in midterm to enter the military.

Lewis served for sixteen years as a trial court judge before he was elected as an associate justice of the South Carolina Supreme Court on February 21, 1961. He was elected chief justice on January 21, 1975 to fill the unexpired term of Joseph Rodney Moss; was sworn in on August 14, 1975; and served until his retirement in 1984. Chief Justice Lewis retired upon reaching the state's mandatory retirement age of 72.

References

Justices of the South Carolina Supreme Court
1912 births
People from Darlington County, South Carolina
1999 deaths
Chief Justices of the South Carolina Supreme Court
20th-century American judges